Mike Davis is an American screenwriter. He was born and raised in Philadelphia, Pennsylvania and optioned his first screenplay, the story of Elvis Presley returning from the grave to become President, shortly after graduating NYU's Tisch School of the Arts.

In 2004 he formed Stag Films, writing and co-producing the independent feature film, Pervert! starring Mary Carey, an homage to Russ Meyer, 1970s sexploitation and grindhouse horror films. Davis has worked with writer/director Matt Piedmont, contributing to comedy segments created by Piedmont for Bud TV, Funny or Die and Comedy Central.

Davis's directorial debut Sex Galaxy was created entirely out of recycled stock and public domain footage, primarily from the 1968 film Voyage to the Planet of Prehistoric Women, which in turned borrowed heavily from Planeta Bur. It screened on the international film festival circuit, winning two "Best Feature" awards and one for "Best Drinking Movie," and was released by Breaking Glass Pictures and Unearthed Films in 2008. Due to its "recycling" of copyright-free stock footage, Davis has dubbed it the world's first 'green movie'.

Davis followed with another 'green' film, the horror/comedy/political satire President Wolfman, about the U.S. President being bitten by a werewolf and terrorizing the streets of Washington. President Wolfman culled much of its footage from The Werewolf of Washington starring Dean Stockwell, in addition to over one hundred other film sources. The movie won many festival awards, including Best Feature, Audience Choice and Best Script, and is distributed by Wild Eye Releasing on VHS and DVD, released in 2014.

He also wrote the screenplay for the film Aloha Santa.

References

External links

Stag Films
Dreadworld.com
Addictedtohorrormovies.com

American male screenwriters
Living people
Year of birth missing (living people)
Tisch School of the Arts alumni
Writers from Philadelphia